Group B of the EuroBasket 2013 took place between 4 and 9 September 2013. The group played all of its games at Podmežakla Hall in Jesenice, Slovenia.

The group composed of Bosnia and Herzegovina, Latvia, Lithuania, Macedonia, Montenegro and Serbia. The three best ranked teams advanced to the second round.

Standings
|}

All times are local (UTC+2)

4 September

Latvia vs. Bosnia and Herzegovina

Macedonia vs. Montenegro

Serbia vs. Lithuania

5 September

Montenegro vs. Latvia

Bosnia and Herzegovina vs. Serbia

Lithuania vs. Macedonia

6 September

Montenegro vs. Bosnia and Herzegovina

Latvia vs. Lithuania

Macedonia vs. Serbia

7 September

Bosnia and Herzegovina vs. Macedonia

Serbia vs. Latvia

Lithuania vs. Montenegro

9 September

Latvia vs. Macedonia

Lithuania vs. Bosnia and Herzegovina

Montenegro vs. Serbia

External links
Standings and fixtures

Group B
2013–14 in Serbian basketball
2013–14 in Montenegrin basketball
2013–14 in Bosnia and Herzegovina basketball
2013–14 in Republic of Macedonia basketball
2013–14 in Latvian basketball